Ideuma Brook is a river in Otsego County, New York. Southeast of Hutchinson Hill flows into an unnamed creek that flows west through Rogers Hollow before converging with the Unadilla River north of Sidney and north of Mount Moses.

References

Rivers of New York (state)
Rivers of Otsego County, New York